Pleasure is an experience of happiness, entertainment, enjoyment, ecstasy, or euphoria.

Pleasure may also refer to:

Film
 Pleasure (1931 film), an American romantic drama film
 Pleasure (2013 film), a Swedish short film
 Pleasure (2021 film), a Swedish film
 The Pleasure, a 1985 Italian erotic drama film
 Pleasures, a 1986 American television film

Music

Performers
 Pleasure (American band), a late-1970s soul, funk and jazz group
 Pleasure (Norwegian band), a 2000s pop band
 Pleasure (go-go band), a 1980s American all-woman band
 Pleasure P (born 1984), American R&B singer-songwriter

Albums
 Pleasure (Club 8 album), 2015
 Pleasure (Feist album), or the title song, 2017
 Pleasure (Girls at Our Best! album), or the title song, 1981
 Pleasure (Marion Meadows album), 1998
 Pleasure (Ohio Players album), or the title song, 1972
 Pleasure (Pearl album), 2015
 Pleasure, by Sondre Lerche, 2017
 Pleasure (EP), by Semisonic, 1995

Songs
 “Pleasure”, by Al Jarreau from L Is for Lover, 1986
 “Pleasure”, by Argent from Ring of Hands, 1971
 “Pleasure”, by Arto Lindsay from Mundo Civilizado, 1997
 “Pleasure”, by Billy Ocean from Tear Down These Walls, 1988
 “Pleasure”, by Iggy Pop from Party, 1981
 "Pleasure", by Justice from Woman, 2016
 "Pleasure", by Montaigne from Complex, 2019
 “Pleasure”, by the Soup Dragons from Hotwired, 1992
 “Pleasure”, by Spandau Ballet from True, 1983
 “Pleasure”, by Sun Ra from Other Planes of There, 1966

See also 
 Western pleasure, a kind of horse-riding competition
 Pleasure Island (disambiguation)
 Pleasure Point (disambiguation)
 Pleasant (disambiguation)